Usnea fulvoreagens is a species of beard lichen in the family Parmeliaceae. It was first described by Finnish lichenologist Veli Räsänen in 1931 as a variety of Usnea glabrescens. He raised it to distinct species status in 1935. The lichen has a shrubby thallus that is richly branched, and bases that are blackened. The presence of norstictic acid is often used to differentiate this species from other similar species. It has a widespread distribution in Europe.

References

fulvoreagens
Lichen species
Lichens described in 1931
Lichens of Europe
Taxa named by Veli Räsänen